"Help Me Out" is a song by American band Maroon 5 and American singer-songwriter Julia Michaels. The song was released on October 6, 2017, as the first promotional single from the band's sixth studio album Red Pill Blues (2017), also as included the sixth track on the record.

Composition
"Help Me Out" is a length of 3 minutes and 13 seconds. It was written and composed by Maroon 5 frontman Adam Levine, Julia Michaels, Thomas Wesley Pentz, King Henry and Justin Tranter. It was produced by Diplo and King Henry with Sam Farrar and Noah Passovoy as co-producers.

Lyric video
On October 23, 2017, a lyric video was released on the band's official YouTube channel. It features the words flashing across the screen in neon lights.

Track listing

Personnel
Maroon 5
Adam Levine – lead and backing vocals, songwriter
Jesse Carmichael – keyboards, rhythm guitar, backing vocals
Mickey Madden – bass 
James Valentine – lead guitar, backing vocals
Matt Flynn – electronic drums, percussion
PJ Morton – keyboards, synthesizer, backing vocals
Sam Farrar – additional instrumentation, co-producer

Additional personnel
Julia Michaels – featured artist, songwriter
Diplo – songwriter, production
King Henry – songwriter, production
Justin Tranter – songwriter
Noah Passovoy – co-producer

Charts

References

2017 songs
2017 singles
Maroon 5 songs
Julia Michaels songs
Songs written by Adam Levine
Songs written by Julia Michaels
Songs written by Diplo
Song recordings produced by Diplo
Songs written by Justin Tranter
222 Records singles
Interscope Records singles
Songs written by King Henry (producer)